Magdalena Birkner (born 18 January 1966) is an Argentine alpine skier. She competed at the 1984 Winter Olympics and the 1988 Winter Olympics.

She is the sister of Ignacio Birkner, Carolina Birkner, and Jorge Birkner. She is the mother of Francisco Saubidet and Bautista Saubidet Birkner.

References

1966 births
Living people
Argentine female alpine skiers
Olympic alpine skiers of Argentina
Alpine skiers at the 1984 Winter Olympics
Alpine skiers at the 1988 Winter Olympics
Skiers from Buenos Aires